The 2021−22 Coppa Italia Serie D was the 22nd edition of Coppa Italia Serie D.

Format and seeding 
The teams enter the competition at various stage, as follows.

 First stage
 Preliminary round: it is contested by 88 teams
 First round: the 44 winners of the preliminary round and the 84 teams who did not play the preliminary round face each other
 Final stage
 Round of 64: the 64 winners face each other
 Round of 32: the 32 winners face each other
 Round of 16: the 16 winners face each other
 Quarter-finals: the 8 winners face each other
 Semi-finals: the 4 winners face each other
 Final: the 2 winners face each other

Schedule

Preliminary round

First round

Round of 64

Round of 32

Round of 16

Quarter-finals

Semi-finals

Final

References 

Coppa Italia Serie D
2021–22 in Italian football cups
2021–22 European domestic association football cups